Sonnadhu Nee Thanaa is a 1978 Indian Tamil-language film directed by C.N.Muthu, starring Vijayakumar, Sumithra and Jai Ganesh. It was released on 30 November 1978.

Cast 
Vijayakumar
Sumithra
Jai Ganesh
Thengai Srinivasan

Soundtrack 
Ilaiyaraaja scored the music for the movie. There were three songs and the lyrics were written by C.N. Muthu and Pulamaipithan.

References

External links 
 

1970s Tamil-language films
1978 films
Films scored by Ilaiyaraaja